Cerebellar Ataxia with Neuropathy and Vestibular Areflexia Syndrome (CANVAS) is an autosomal recessive late-onset heredodegenerative multisystem neurological disease. The symptoms include poor balance and difficulty walking. Chronic cough and difficulty swallowing may also be present. Clinical findings include ataxia, sensory neuropathy, and absence of the vestibulo–ocular reflex. The syndrome was initially described in 2004. In 2019, the cause was identified as biallelic pentanucleotide expansion in the RFC1 gene.

Epidemiology 
The prevalence of the disease is currently unknown, largely owing to its recent description and delineation from other forms of autosomal recessive cerebellar ataxia.

Prognosis and treatment 
Specific treatment is lacking. A multidisciplinary approach to supportive care is recommended. The progression is typically slow, with 55% of patients needing mobility aids 10 years after onset, and 25% needing a wheelchair after 15 years.

References 

Systemic atrophies primarily affecting the central nervous system